Mark Divo (born 1966) is a Swiss-Luxembourgish conceptual artist and curator who organizes large-scale interactive art projects incorporating the work of underground artists. His work involves painting, performance, photography, sculpture, and installation.

Career

Between 1988 and 1989 Divo worked in West Berlin. After the fall of the Berlin wall in 1989, he moved to East Berlin, where he organized exhibitions at the Kunst Haus Tacheles. Between 1990 – 1994 he organized exhibitions, performances, and murals with the Duncker group.

In 1994 he moved back to Zurich where he created a number of murals and organised a group of travelling mural painters. There he organised a number of underground art projects funded by the Swiss government, including exhibitions / events in the subways of Escherwyssplatz. In 1995, he organised a festival of underground art. Amongst the artists who exhibited were Swiss artist Ingo Giezendanner, German artist Leumund Cult and British artist Lennie Lee.

In the winter of 2002, he occupied the Cabaret Voltaire with different artists including Dan Jones. Together they succeeded in preventing the location's closure. The building has now been turned into a museum dedicated to Dada (Cabaret Voltaire). In 2003 he organised another Dada festival at the Sihlpapierfabrik.

Beginning in 2003, Divo organised an annual Dada festival. In 2004, he was awarded a one year art residency at the Swiss Institute Contemporary Art New York in West Broadway, New York where he invited artists to exhibit alongside him. In the summer of 2008 he established the Divo Institute, a new multi-disciplinary arts centre in the city of Kolín, near Prague. In August 2009 Divo was one of thirty artist-curators who presented work by artists from the Divo Institute at the Subvision Art Festival, Hamburg. 

Since becoming an artist, Divo has exhibited in museums throughout Europe including the Helmhaus, Zurich, the Contemporary Art Center, Vilnius, the Kunsthaus Zurich and the Kinsky Palace, Prague. He has created three public sculptures for the city of Zurich.

Since 2002, working in collaboration with artists, performers and photographers, Divo has produced a series of large format conceptual photographs in which he satirises politics and mocks art history.

External links
 
DADATA.CH | archive of events organized by Mark Divo
Kroesus Foundation, the main website showing mark Divo's recent projects
The Real Biennale, inhabited sculpture at the Kinsky palace, Prague
Prague Biennale
List of artists at the Cabaret Voltaire (Zurich)
List of important Swiss artists

1966 births
Living people
Luxembourgian artists
Luxembourgian curators